Ecnomiomorpha caracana is a species of moth of the family Tortricidae. It is found in Minas Gerais, Brazil.

References

Moths described in 1999
Euliini
Moths of South America
Taxa named by Józef Razowski